Mary Sharon Vaughn (born May 2, 1947) is an American musician, songwriter and producer who was previously based in Sweden. She has written hits for artists such as Willie Nelson, Waylon Jennings, Reba McEntire, The Oak Ridge Boys, George Jones, Kenny Rogers, Keith Whitley, Randy Travis, Patty Loveless, Agnes, Kate Ryan, Claire Richards, Boyzone, September, and Dimash Qudaibergen.

Career
Vaughn moved to Nashville in her early 20s. In 1974, she charted two singles as a performer for Cinnamon Records: a duet with Narvel Felts titled "Until the End of Time", and "Never a Night Goes By". A year later, she signed with Dot Records and released a third single, "You and Me, Me and You". She was also the lead singer in the Lea Jane Singers, and worked with the Jordanaires, the Nashville Edition and The Holladay Sisters.

Vaughn’s first big songwriting success was "My Heroes Have Always Been Cowboys", which was first recorded by Waylon Jennings in 1976 and further popularized in 1980 by Willie Nelson for the soundtrack of the movie The Electric Horseman. Her next songwriting hit was "Y'all Come Back Saloon" by The Oak Ridge Boys in 1977. Since then she has worked with country artists such as Dolly Parton, Waylon Jennings, George Jones, Tammy Wynette, Tanya Tucker and Kenny Rogers. Vaughn has been nominated for the Nashville Songwriters Hall of Fame three times, and was inducted in 2019.

Vaughn has during the last couple of years had over 100 cuts with European artists and four number ones in Japan. She has worked with several Swedish Idol artists, including the winner Jay Smith (2010) and a number one hit for Ola. She has also worked with many Scandinavian songwriters and artists including Agnes, Mutt Lange, Tony Nilsson, Vendela, Anders Hanson and Emilia.

In 2009, her co-written song Release Me by Swedish pop artist Agnes reached #1 on the U.S Billboard Dance Club Songs Chart. In 2013, Vaughn received a JASRAC Award as #1 of the Top 10 Foreign Works for her 2011 co-written song "Rising Sun" by the Japanese pop band EXILE.

During 2014, Vaughn competed as the songwriter of three songs in Melodifestivalen.

Vaughn has also co-written songs with Ian Dench and Carl Falk.

Vaughn moved to Sweden in 2008. In 2018, she was registered as having emigrated from Sweden. She returned to Orlando and then moved to Nashville in 2020 where she currently works.

Charted singles

Songs written
The following table lists a selection of songs from Vaughn's career as a songwriter:

References

American women country singers
American country singer-songwriters
Dot Records artists
Living people
Musicians from Stockholm
American expatriates in Sweden
People from Orlando, Florida
Singer-songwriters from Florida
Country musicians from Florida
1947 births
21st-century American women